Color Theory (stylized in all lowercase) is the second studio album by American indie rock singer-songwriter Soccer Mommy, released on February 28, 2020 by Loma Vista Recordings.

Critical reception

Color Theory was met with critical acclaim from critics. At Metacritic, which assigns a normalized rating out of 100 to reviews from mainstream critics, the album received an average score of 81, which indicates "universal acclaim", based on 22 reviews.

Accolades

Track listing

Personnel
Credits are adapted from the album's liner notes.

Musicians
 Sophie Allison – vocals, songwriting (all tracks); acoustic guitar (1–4, 7, 8), electric guitar (1–6, 8–10), EPS 16 (3, 4), Prophet (5, 6, 10), Mellotron, Wurlitzer (6); keyboard (8), Juno (9)
 Rodrigo Avendano – piano, SH-101, Prophet (1); SP-404 (2), electric guitar (5, 8), organ (7), keyboard (8)
 Julian Powell – electric guitar (1–8, 10), Wurlitzer (1), twelve-string guitar (2), piano (3, 4), acoustic guitar (5)
 Gabe Wax – SH-101 (1, 2), Prophet (1, 5, 6), EPS 16 (1, 5), Juno (2, 3), SP-404, percussion (2); electric guitar (3, 6), conga, ambience (3); background vocals (3, 6, 10), bass (4, 7), OP-1 (5), Wurlitzer (7, 10), shaker (7), keyboard (8), organ, drum programming (10)
 Graene Goetz – bass (1–3, 5, 6, 8, 10), MicroKORG (2)
 Ryan Elwell – drums (1–3, 5–8)
 Brett Resnick – pedal steel guitar (6, 10)
 Mary Lattimore – harp (6)
 Jackson Foraker – twelve-string guitar (7)

Production and artwork
 Gabe Wax – production, recording
 Boone Wallace – recording assistant
 Lars Stalfors – mixing
 Joe LaPorta – mastering
 Joe Nino-Hernes – vinyl cutting
 Brian Ziff – photography
 Lordess Foudre – package design

Charts

See also
 List of 2020 albums

References

External links
 

2020 albums
Soccer Mommy albums
Loma Vista Recordings albums